Monticello of Monticello Heights in Cynthiana, Kentucky was built in 1883.  It was listed on the National Register of Historic Places in 1974.

It is a mansion which was built around 1883 for Thomas Jefferson Megibben at reported cost of $300,000.  It overlooks the town of Cynthiana and was approached by a long curving drive.  It was designed by the Cincinnati architectural firm of Samuel Hannaford.

The house no longer exists but its carriage house survives.

References

National Register of Historic Places in Harrison County, Kentucky
Buildings and structures completed in 1883
1883 establishments in Kentucky
Former buildings and structures in Kentucky
Carriage houses on the National Register of Historic Places
Transportation in Harrison County, Kentucky
Transportation buildings and structures on the National Register of Historic Places in Kentucky
Cynthiana, Kentucky